Joshua Ribera  (10 August 1995 – 21 September 2013), performing as Depzman, was a British rapper, considered by some "a leading artist on the UK grime scene." Ribera featured on some of the largest music channels on YouTube that showcase grime music all across the UK, from JDZMedia, P110 and, the largest out of them all, SB.TV. He was stabbed in the heart outside of a Birmingham nightclub by Armani Mitchell. He was 18 years old.

Life
Ribera was born in Solihull on 10 August 1995, to Alison Cope and Anselm Ribera, who was convicted of murder in 2009. Ribera was of Spanish and Irish descent through his father. He became serious about music after being sentenced to a young offender institution for theft, gaining a name for himself in the grime genre. In 2012 he took part in the "Lord of the Mics" battle-rap competition in London. His only album, 2 Real, was released in July 2013, and reached number 1 on the iTunes hip hop chart.

Death
On 20 September 2013, Ribera attended a memorial tribute at a Selly Oak nightclub held for a friend, Shamz, who had died exactly one year earlier after being stabbed in the leg. Ribera was stabbed in the heart at the event and died the next day. In March 2014, his killer, Armani Mitchell, was sentenced to life imprisonment, to serve a minimum of 18 years.

Discography
 2 Real (2013)

References

External links
 Depz, Celebrate, P110 YouTube channel
 Depz, Reality, P110 YouTube channel

1995 births
2013 deaths
People from Solihull
Rappers from Birmingham, West Midlands
English people of Irish descent
English people of Spanish descent
English male rappers
Grime music artists
People murdered in England
Deaths by stabbing in England
English murder victims
Male murder victims
British people convicted of theft